Plum Run may refer to:

Plum Run (Rock Creek), a stream in Pennsylvania
Plum Run (White Run), a stream in Pennsylvania
Plum Run (Chartiers Run tributary), a stream in Washington County, Pennsylvania
Plum Run (Tenmile Creek tributary), a stream in Washington County, Pennsylvania
Plum Run, West Virginia, an unincorporated community in Tyler County